Tony Marchant (born ) is an English former professional rugby league footballer who played in the 1980s and 1990s.

Background
Tony Marchant's birth was registered in Pontefract district, West Riding of Yorkshire, England.

Playing career

Marchant won caps for Great Britain while at Castleford in 1986 against France, and Australia (2 matches).

In 1986 Marchant played a handful of games for Brisbane Rugby League club, Wynnum Manly Seagulls, who won the premiership that year.

Tony Marchant played  (replaced by interchange/substitute Phil Hellewell on 41-minutes) in Bradford Northern's 2-12 defeat by Warrington in the 1990–91 Regal Trophy Final during the 1990–91 season at Headingley, Leeds on Saturday 12 January 1991, and played  in the 15-8 defeat by Wigan in the 1992–93 Regal Trophy Final during the 1992–93 season at Elland Road, Leeds on Saturday 23 January 1993.

References

External links
!Great Britain Statistics at englandrl.co.uk (statistics currently missing due to not having appeared for both Great Britain, and England)

1962 births
Living people
Bradford Bulls players
Castleford Tigers players
Dewsbury Rams players
English rugby league players
Great Britain national rugby league team players
Rugby league centres
Rugby league players from Pontefract
Rugby league wingers
Wynnum Manly Seagulls players
Yorkshire rugby league team players